Jack H. Chadirdjian is a politician, an attorney, and a City Councillor in Montreal, Quebec, Canada.

City Councillor
He was elected to Montreal's City Council as a Vision Montreal candidate in the district of Darlington in 1994, defeating RCM incumbent Hubert Simard.

Leader of the Opposition
In 1997, he left Vision Montreal and sat as an Independent.  With five other colleagues, he joined Jacques Duchesneau's Nouveau Montréal (New Montreal) party and became Leader of the Opposition.

Political decline
In 1998 he was defeated by Vision Montreal candidate Jean Fortier.

See also
Vision Montreal Crisis, 1997

Electoral record (incomplete)

Footnotes

Chadirdjian, Jack
Chadirdjian, Jack
Canadian people of Armenian descent
Living people
Year of birth missing (living people)